The Metropolitan of Kyiv and All Ukraine is the archbishop of the Orthodox Church of Ukraine, canonized at the Unifying council of 2018 in Kyiv.

History 
Epiphanius I is the first Primate of the Orthodox Church of Ukraine. He is styled "Metropolitan of Kyiv and All Ukraine". He was elected at the Unification Council and received the tomos of autocephaly from the Ecumenical Patriarch on 6 January 2019. After the council, the newly elected metropolitan addressed the public on the Sophia Square in Kyiv.

Metropolitan of Kyiv and All Ukraine

Governance
The head of the Orthodox Church of Ukraine (Metropolitan of Kyiv and All Ukraine) is elected for life. According to the Statute, the Metropolitan of Kyiv is elected from three by the Local Council chaired by the vicar by secret ballot.

Use of the title 
The head of the UOC-MP religious organization Onufrii Berezovskyi was warned by the Ecumenical Patriarch that after 15 December 2018, representatives of the Moscow Patriarchate have no right to ecclesiologically and canonically bear the title of Metropolitan of Kyiv. He went on to say that their use of such title was in violation of the terms of official documents of the ROC of 1686. This was reflected in the yearbook of the Patriarchate of Constantinople, published after the Orthodox Church of Ukraine received autocephaly: the bishops of the ROC in Ukraine are named in it only by reference to the place of residence; for example, Bishop Onufrii Berezovsky is no longer mentioned as the Metropolitan of Kyiv and All Ukraine, but is called "the Metropolitan of Kyiv." The entire episcopate of the ROC in Ukraine in the yearbook of the Ecumenical Patriarchate is included in the list of bishops of the Orthodox Church of Russia. Patriarch Bartholomew also met with ROC Patriarch Kirill and said that "the Ecumenical Patriarchate has decided to use all means to resolve the issue of granting autocephaly to the Ukrainian Orthodox Church. The decision was made in April. And Fanar implements this decision "(according to the representative of Bartholomew, Metropolitan of Gaul Emanuel).

See also 
 Metropolis of Kiev and all Rus'
 Metropolis of Kiev, Galicia and all Ruthenia
 List of metropolitans and patriarchs of Kyiv

References 

History of Eastern Orthodoxy
History of Christianity in Ukraine
Ecclesiastical titles
Ukrainian Orthodox metropolitan bishops
Metropolitans of Kiev and all Rus'